Can I Do It... 'Til I Need Glasses? is a 1977 American anthology comedy film and the sequel of If You Don't Stop It... You'll Go Blind, directed by I. Robert Levy and starring Angelyne. It was Robin Williams' film debut.

Plot
A sex comedy of various raunchy comedic sketches.

Cast 
 Angelyne as Little Red Riding Hood
 I. Robert Levy as man on Bus 
 Thelma Pelish as Angry Lady 
 Ron Jeremy as Promoter 
 Robin Williams as Lawyer / Man with Toothache 
 Ina Gould as Random Old Lady
 Rod Haase as Omar
 Roger Behr as himself 
 Joey Camen as himself   
 Jeff Doucette as himself

Re-release and court case
Robin Williams, an unknown comedian at the time, was paid $150 to appear in two short skits (as an attorney and a hillbilly with a toothache) which did not make it into the original cut of the film. The movie failed to turn a profit during its initial release, but after Williams became a star on the hit TV show Mork & Mindy, producer Mike Callie spent two weeks in December 1978 sorting through the deleted footage until he located the "lost" Robin Williams scenes, then edited them back in and re-released the film with Williams being given top billing. Williams and his management took legal action against Callie and the film distributor for "false and misleading advertising," and during a court hearing Callie agreed to modify the newspaper and TV ads so they would no longer imply that Williams was the star of the film.

Reception
Variety called it "a juvenile, unfunny screen version of some of the oldest and worst sex jokes in comedy history." Linda Gross of the Los Angeles Times wrote that the film was "lamely directed" and had something that "will insult almost everyone."

References

External links 
 
 

1977 comedy films
1977 films
American comedy films
American anthology films
American sequel films
Sketch comedy films
1970s English-language films
1970s American films